Laura und Luis is a German television series.

Cast

 Coco Winkelmann : Laura
 Jan Andres : Luis
 Relda Ridoni : Hyppolita
 Carla Monti : Mariuola
 Macha Méril : Viscida
 Claude-Oliver Rudolph : Cuozzo
 Beate Jensen : Nadja
 Damien Lechevrel : Thierry Bibi
 Vanessa Gravina : Giuliana
 Liuba Consonni : Pina
 Remo Varisco : Monsignore
 Giorgio De Giorgi : Maresciallo
 Patrick Bach : Sebastian Krass
 Dietrich Mattausch : Pater Fischer
 Roger Dumas : Fishmonger
 Charles Berling

See also
List of German television series

External links
 

1989 German television series debuts
1989 German television series endings
German children's television series
ZDF original programming